Stannoidite is a sulfide mineral composed of five chemical elements: copper, iron, zinc, tin and sulfur. Its name originates from Latin stannum (tin) and Greek eides (or Latin oïda meaning "like"). The mineral is found in hydrothermal Cu-Sn deposits.

Stannoidite was first described in 1969 for an occurrence in the Konjo mine, Okayama prefecture, Honshu Island, Japan.

See also
 Stannite
 Kesterite

References

Sulfide minerals
Orthorhombic minerals
Minerals in space group 23